Jacob Johnson may refer to:

Jacob Johnson (father of Andrew Johnson) (1778–1812), father of U.S. president Andrew Johnson
Jacob Johnson (American politician) (1847–1925), congressman for Utah from 1913
Jacob Johnson (Swedish politician) (born 1948), Swedish politician
Jake Johnson, American actor